Caesium-137, cesium-137 (US), or radiocaesium, is a radioactive isotope of caesium that is formed as one of the more common fission products by the nuclear fission of uranium-235 and other fissionable isotopes in nuclear reactors and nuclear weapons. Trace quantities also originate from spontaneous fission of uranium-238. It is among the most problematic of the short-to-medium-lifetime fission products. After being deposited onto the soil as radioactive fallout, it moves and spreads easily in the environment because of the high water solubility of caesium's most common chemical compounds, which are salts. Caesium-137 was discovered by Glenn T. Seaborg and Margaret Melhase.

Decay

Caesium-137 has a half-life of about 30.05 years.
About 94.6% decays by beta emission to a metastable nuclear isomer of barium: barium-137m (137mBa, Ba-137m). The remainder directly populates the ground state of 137Ba, which is stable. Barium-137m has a half-life of about 153 seconds, and is responsible for all of the gamma ray emissions in samples of 137Cs. Barium-137m decays to the ground state by emission of photons having energy 0.6617 MeV. A total of 85.1% of 137Cs decay generates gamma ray emission in this manner. One gram of 137Cs has an activity of 3.215 terabecquerel (TBq).

Uses 
Caesium-137 has a number of practical uses. In small amounts, it is used to calibrate radiation-detection equipment. In medicine, it is used in radiation therapy. In industry, it is used in flow meters, thickness gauges, moisture-density gauges (for density readings, with americium-241/beryllium providing the moisture reading), and in gamma ray well logging devices.

Caesium-137 is not widely used for industrial radiography because it is hard to obtain a very high specific activity material with a well defined (and small) shape as caesium from used nuclear fuel contains stable caesium-133 and also long-lived caesium-135. Isotope separation is too costly compared to cheaper alternatives. Also the higher specific activity caesium sources tend to be made from very soluble caesium chloride (CsCl), as a result if a radiography source was damaged it would increase the spread of the contamination. Other chemically inert caesium compounds include caesium-aluminosilicate-glasses akin to the natural mineral pollucite. The latter has been used in demonstration of chemically stable water-insoluble forms of nuclear waste for disposal in deep geological repositories. Cobalt-60 decays to stable nickel, whereas iridium-192 can decay to either stable osmium or platinum. Due to the residual radioactivity and legal hurdles, the resulting material is not commonly recovered even from "spent" radioactive sources, meaning in essence that the entire mass is "lost" for non-radioactive uses.

As an almost purely human-made isotope, caesium-137 has been used to date wine and detect counterfeits and as a relative-dating material for assessing the age of sedimentation occurring after 1945.

Caesium-137 is also used as a radioactive tracer in geologic research to measure soil erosion and deposition.

Health risks 
Caesium-137 reacts with water, producing a water-soluble compound (caesium hydroxide). The biological behaviour of caesium is similar to that of potassium and rubidium. After entering the body, caesium gets more or less uniformly distributed throughout the body, with the highest concentrations in soft tissue.  However, unlike group 2 radionuclides like radium and strontium-90, caesium does not bioaccumulate and is excreted relatively quickly. The biological half-life of caesium is about 70 days.

A 1961 experiment showed that mice dosed with 21.5 μCi/g had a 50% fatality within 30 days (implying an LD50 of 245 μg/kg). A similar experiment in 1972 showed that when dogs are subjected to a whole body burden of 3800 μCi/kg (140 MBq/kg, or approximately 44 μg/kg) of caesium-137 (and 950 to 1400 rads), they die within 33 days, while animals with half of that burden all survived for a year.  Important researches have shown a remarkable concentration of 137Cs in the exocrine cells of the pancreas, which are those most affected by cancer. In 2003, in autopsies performed on 6 children who died (of reasons not directly linked to Chernobyl, mostly sepsis) in the polluted area near Chernobyl where they also reported a higher incidence of pancreatic tumors, Bandazhevsky found a concentration of 137Cs 3.9 times higher than in their liver (1359 vs 347 Bq/kg, equivalent to 36 and 9.3 nCi/kg in these organs, 600 Bq/kg = 16 nCi/kg in the body according to measurements), thus demonstrating that pancreatic tissue is a strong accumulator and secretor in the intestine of radioactive cesium. , 
Accidental ingestion of caesium-137 can be treated with Prussian blue (Fe[Fe(CN)]), which binds to it chemically and reduces the biological half-life to 30 days.

Environmental contamination 

Caesium-137, along with other radioactive isotopes caesium-134, iodine-131, xenon-133, and strontium-90, were released into the environment during nearly all nuclear weapon tests and some nuclear accidents, most notably the Chernobyl disaster and the Fukushima Daiichi disaster.

Caesium-137 in the environment is substantially anthropogenic (human-made). Caesium-137 is produced from the nuclear fission of plutonium and uranium, and decays into barium-137. By observing the characteristic gamma rays emitted by this isotope, one can determine whether the contents of a given sealed container were made before or after the first atomic bomb explosion (Trinity test, 16 July 1945), which spread some of it into the atmosphere, quickly distributing trace amounts of it around the globe. This procedure has been used by researchers to check the authenticity of certain rare wines, most notably the purported "Jefferson bottles". Surface soils and sediments are also dated by measuring the activity of 137Cs.

Chernobyl disaster 

As of today and for the next few hundred years or so, caesium-137 and strontium-90 continue to be the principal source of radiation in the zone of alienation around the Chernobyl nuclear power plant, and pose the greatest risk to health, owing to their approximately 30 year half-life and biological uptake. The mean contamination of caesium-137 in Germany following the Chernobyl disaster was 2000 to 4000 Bq/m2. This corresponds to a contamination of 1 mg/km2 of caesium-137, totaling about 500 grams deposited over all of Germany. In Scandinavia, some reindeer and sheep exceeded the Norwegian legal limit (3000 Bq/kg) 26 years after Chernobyl. As of 2016, the Chernobyl caesium-137 has decayed by half, but could have been locally concentrated by much larger factors.

Fukushima Daiichi disaster 

In April 2011, elevated levels of caesium-137 were also being found in the environment after the Fukushima Daiichi nuclear disasters in Japan. In July 2011, meat from 11 cows shipped to Tokyo from Fukushima Prefecture was found to have 1,530 to 3,200 becquerels per kilogram of 137Cs, considerably exceeding the Japanese legal limit of 500 becquerels per kilogram at that time. In March 2013, a fish caught near the plant had a record 740,000 becquerels per kilogram of radioactive caesium, above the 100 becquerels per kilogram government limit. A 2013 paper in Scientific Reports found that for a forest site 50 km from the stricken plant, 137Cs concentrations were high in leaf litter, fungi and detritivores, but low in herbivores. By the end of 2014, "Fukushima-derived radiocaesium had spread into the whole western North Pacific Ocean", transported by the North Pacific current from Japan to the Gulf of Alaska. It has been measured in the surface layer down to 200 meters and south of the current area down to 400 meters.

Caesium-137 is reported to be the major health concern in Fukushima. A number of techniques are being considered that will be able to strip out 80% to 95% of the caesium from contaminated soil and other materials efficiently and without destroying the organic material in the soil. These include hydrothermal blasting. The caesium precipitated with ferric ferrocyanide (Prussian blue) would be the only waste requiring special burial sites. The aim is to get annual exposure from the contaminated environment down to 1 mSv above background. The most contaminated area where radiation doses are greater than 50 mSv/year must remain off limits, but some areas that are currently less than 5 mSv/year may be decontaminated, allowing 22,000 residents to return.

Incidents and accidents
Caesium-137 gamma sources have been involved in several radiological accidents and incidents.

1987 Goiânia, Goiás, Brazil
In the Goiânia accident of 1987, an improperly disposed of radiation therapy system from an abandoned clinic in Goiânia, Brazil, was removed then cracked to be sold in junkyards, and the glowing caesium salt sold to curious, unadvised buyers. This led to four confirmed deaths and several serious injuries from radiation contamination.

1989 Kramatorsk, Donetsk, Ukraine
The Kramatorsk radiological accident happened in 1989 when a small capsule 8x4 mm in size of caesium-137 was found inside the concrete wall of an apartment building in Kramatorsk, Ukrainian SSR. It is believed that the capsule, originally a part of a measurement device, was lost in the late 1970s and ended up mixed with gravel used to construct the building in 1980. Over 9 years, two families had lived in the apartment. By the time the capsule was discovered, 6 residents of the building had died, 4 from leukemia and 17 more had received varying doses of radiation.

1997 Georgia
In 1997, several Georgian soldiers suffered radiation poisoning and burns. They were eventually traced back to training sources abandoned, forgotten, and unlabeled after the dissolution of the Soviet Union. One was a caesium-137 pellet in a pocket of a shared jacket that put out about 130,000 times the level of background radiation at 1 meter distance.

1998 Los Barrios, Cádiz, Spain
In the Acerinox accident of 1998, the Spanish recycling company Acerinox accidentally melted down a mass of radioactive caesium-137 that came from a gamma-ray generator.

2009 Tongchuan, Shaanxi, China
In 2009, a Chinese cement company (in Tongchuan, Shaanxi Province) was demolishing an old, unused cement plant and did not follow standards for handling radioactive materials. This caused some caesium-137 from a measuring instrument to be included with eight truckloads of scrap metal on its way to a steel mill, where the radioactive caesium was melted down into the steel.

March 2015, University of Tromsø, Norway
In March 2015, the Norwegian University of Tromsø lost 8 radioactive samples including samples of caesium-137, americium-241, and strontium-90. The samples were moved out of a secure location to be used for education. When the samples were supposed to be returned the university was unable to find them.  the samples are still missing.

March 2016 Helsinki, Uusimaa, Finland
On 3 and 4 March 2016, unusually high levels of caesium-137 were detected in the air in Helsinki, Finland. According to STUK, the country's nuclear regulator, measurements showed 4,000 μBq/m3 – about 1,000 times the usual level. An investigation by the agency traced the source to a building from which STUK and a radioactive waste treatment company operate.

May 2019 Seattle, Washington, United States
Thirteen people were exposed to caesium-137 in May 2019 at the Research and Training building in the Harborview Medical Center complex. A contract crew was transferring the caesium from the lab to a truck when the powder was spilled. Five people were decontaminated and released, but 8 who were more directly exposed were taken to the hospital while the research building was evacuated.

January 2023 Western Australia, Australia

Public health authorities in Western Australia issued an emergency alert for a stretch of road measuring about 1,400 km after a capsule containing caesium-137 was lost in transport on 25 January 2023. The 8 mm capsule contained a small quantity of the radioactive material when it disappeared from a truck. The State Government immediately launched a search, with the WA Department of Health's chief health officer Andrew Robertson warning an exposed person could expect to receive the equivalent of "about 10 X-rays an hour". Experts warned, if the capsule were found, the public should stay at least 5 metres away. The capsule was found on 1 February 2023.

March 2023 Prachin Buri, Thailand 
Officials from Thailand’s Office of Atoms for Peace (OAP) and Prachin Buri provincial administration are trying to recover a caesium-137 capsule, which went missing from a steam power plant in Prachin Buri Province. It was lost since 23 February 2023 but Thai public was not notified until 14 March.

A 50,000 baht reward is offered for information leading to the recovery of the caesium-137 tube. The search is ongoing.

On the 20th of March, the Secretary-General of Thailand's Office of Atoms for Peace (OAP) and Prachin Buri's Governor held a press conference stating that a remnant of caesium-137 was found inside a recycling facility but could not confirm whether it was the missing caesium-137 or not.

See also
Commonly used gamma-emitting isotopes

References

Bibliography

External links
NLM Hazardous Substances Databank – Cesium, Radioactive
Cesium-137 dirty bombs by Theodore Liolios

Isotopes of caesium
Fission products
Radioisotope fuels
Radioactive contamination